Front Populaire is part of Line 12 of the Paris Métro. It is named after the nearby Place du Front Populaire in Aubervilliers on the border with Saint-Denis, which was named in honour of a coalition of left-wing parties that governed France from 1936 to 1938. It was the 301st station to open.

History 

Line 12 began operating on 5 November 1910 from Porte de Versailles  to Notre-Dame-de-Lorette. During its construction, an extension to north of the line was planned and provisions were made at the end of the tunnels. These provisions were used in the 1960s for the construction of the A1 autoroute, putting an end to the possibility of using it for the line's extension.

Towards the end of the 1990s, when the fourth Contrat de plan État-région (2000-2006) was released, an extension of line 12 was included in the plan to provide métro service to the communes of Saint-Denis and Aubervilliers. Consultations began in 2001 and public inquiries were conducted from 10 June 2003 until 11 July 2003 to determine the construction details and location of the station, with the declaration of public utility occurring on 8 June 2004.

Construction broke ground on 25 June 2008. The station was built by open-air excavation sheltered by diaphragm walls where the walls were built before excavation of the station box to prevent the ground from collapsing inwards. By the end of 2009, the platform walls and mezzanine were completed. On 15 July 2010, the tunnel boring machine, Élodie, reached the station from pont de Stains, then continuing its way towards Boulevard Périphérique, where the exit shaft was located in September 2010. In order to enter the station, a submerged drilling technique was employed; the station was flooded before the tunnel boring machine pierced a specially designed watertight diaphragm wall. The first escalator was installed on 3 February 2012.

The station opened as part of the first phase of the extension of line 12 from Porte de la Chapelle to Mairie d’Aubervilliers on 18 December 2012, although the tunnels had already been completed until Mairie d’Aubervilliers. It was the line's northern terminus until the second phase from Aimé Césaire to Mairie d'Aubervilliers opened on 31 May 2022.

In 2019, the station was used by 2,802,852 passengers, making it the 190th busiest of the Métro network out of 302 stations.

In 2020, the station was used by 1,525,242 passengers amidst the COVID-19 pandemic, making it the 174th busiest of the Métro network out of 305 stations.

In 2021, the station was used by 1,948,542 passengers, making it the 183th busiest of the Métro network out of 305 stations.

Passenger services

Access 
The station has 3 accesses:

 Access 1: rue Léon Blum (with a lift)
 Access 2: rue Waldeck Rochet Campus Condorcet
 Access 3: avenue George Sand

Station layout

Platforms 
The station has a standard configuration with 2 tracks surrounded by 2 side platforms.

Other connections 
The station is also served by lines 139, 239, and 302 of the RATP bus network. The station could also be served in the future by Île-de-France tramway Line 8 when it is extended from Saint-Denis–Porte de Paris to Rosa Parks.

Gallery

See also
 List of stations of the Paris Métro

References

Paris Métro stations in Aubervilliers
Paris Métro stations in Saint-Denis
Railway stations in France opened in 2012
Paris Métro line 12